Tusker or Tuskers may refer to:


Animals
 an elephant with genetic properties granting him large tusks
 an adult male wild boar, particularly the American razorback population

Military unit nicknames
 4th Battalion, 64th Armor Regiment, a United States Army unit
 No. 5 Squadron IAF, an Indian Air Force squadron
 413 Transport and Rescue Squadron, a Canadian Armed Forces air force squadron

Sports teams
 Sri Lanka rugby union team  nickname "The Tuskers”
 East Africa rugby union team, who tour under the nickname "Tuskers"
 Tusker F.C., a Kenyan football club owned by the East African Breweries
 Ballari Tuskers, a Karnataka Premier League cricket franchise
 Kochi Tuskers Kerala, a former Indian Premier League cricket franchise
 Florida Tuskers, a former United Football League franchise
 Matabeleland Tuskers, a Zimbabwean cricket franchise
 Tuskers women's cricket team, a Zimbabwean women's cricket team

Other uses
 Tusker (beer), a Kenyan beer bottled by East African Breweries
 Tusker Rock, a rock in the Bristol Channel, Wales
 a character in the Japanese anime series Kiba
 a member of the DC Comics Justice League of Earth
 the University of Nebraska's former Holland Computing Center high memory cluster
 the name of a DHR B Class steam locomotive
 the sports teams of Somers High School (New York), a public school

See also
 Tusk